Bogani Nani Wartabone National Park  is a 2,871 km2 (1,108 mi2) national park on Minahassa Peninsula on Sulawesi island, Indonesia. Formerly known as Dumoga Bone National Park, it was established in 1991 and was renamed in honour of Nani Wartabone, a local resistance fighter who drove the Japanese from Gorontalo during World War II. The park has been identified by Wildlife Conservation Society as the single most important site for the conservation of Sulawesi wildlife  and is home to many species endemic to Sulawesi.

Flora and fauna
Common plant species in the park are Piper aduncum, Trema orientalis, Macaranga species and various orchids. Endangered plants in the park include the matayangan palm (Pholidocarpus ihur), Makassar Ebony, iron wood (Intsia spp.), yellow wood (Arcangelisia flava), and carrion flower (Amorphophallus companulatus).

In the park there have been recorded 24 mammal, 11 reptile and 125 bird species. These include the endangered anoa and cinnabar hawk owl, which was only described scientifically in 1999 from a specimen collected from the park.

Among the larger animals of the park are babirusas and the Sulawesi warty pig.

Maleo breeding
The maleo megapode is endemic to the island and is the park's mascot. Maleo birds have been bred successfully in this park, and as per February 2012, about 3,300 birds have been released to their habitat. Hungoyono camp in Bone Bolango is the largest maleo habitat which the conservationists have 4 breeding sites. Normally the birds need geothermal hot sand for their breeding as in Hungoyono camp.

Threats
The park is threatened by uncontrolled logging, poaching and illegal gold mining.

See also

 Geography of Indonesia

References

External links
Bogani Nani Wartabone National Park
 Sulawesi national park last refuge for threatened wildlife
WorldTwitch – Australasia Bird News

National parks of Indonesia
Sulawesi
Protected areas established in 1991
1991 establishments in Indonesia
Geography of North Sulawesi
Geography of Gorontalo (province)
Tourist attractions in North Sulawesi
Tourist attractions in Gorontalo (province)